Haiduan Township is a mountain indigenous township in Taitung County, Taiwan. It has an area of 880.0382 km2, with a population of 4,224 as of February 2023. The main population is the Bunun people of the Taiwanese aborigines.

Administrative divisions
 Jiana Village
 Kanding Village
 Haiduan Village
 Guangyuan Village
 Wulu Village
 Lidao Village

Tourist attractions
 Bunun Cultural Museum
 Chiaming Lake
 Lisong Hot Spring
 Xiangyang National Forest Recreation Area
 Lidao Scenic Area
 Lidao Settlement
 Pishan Hot Spring
 Tianlong Suspension Bridge
 Wulu Fort
 Wulu Gorge
 Wulu Hot Spring
 Yakou Scenic Area

References

External links

 Haiduan Township Office

Townships in Taitung County
Taiwan placenames originating from Formosan languages